Willie D. Madrid is an American politician and educator, currently serving as a member of the New Mexico House of Representatives from the 53rd district, which includes Doña Ana, New Mexico.

Early life 
Madrid is a native of Chaparral, New Mexico.

Career 
Prior to entering politics, Madrid worked as an instructional assistant and football coach in the Gadsden Independent Schools. In the 2018 election, Madrid defeated incumbent Republican Ricky Little. He took office on January 15, 2019.

References 

Democratic Party members of the New Mexico House of Representatives
People from Doña Ana County, New Mexico
Year of birth missing (living people)
Living people